Minuscule 121 (in the Gregory-Aland numbering), δ 258 (Soden), is a Greek minuscule manuscript of the New Testament, on parchment leaves. Palaeographically it has been assigned to the 12th century. It has full marginalia.

Description 

The codex contains the text of the New Testament, except Book of Revelation, on 222 parchment leaves (size ) with some lacunae (Acts 1:1-14; 21:15-22:28; 1 John 4:20-Jude End; Romans 1:1-7:13; 1 Cor 2:7-14:23).

The text is written in one column per page, 30-32 lines per page (size of text 12.4 by 9 cm). The initial letters in red.

There is also a division according to the Ammonian Sections (in Mark 234 - 16:8), with references to the Eusebian Canons (written below Ammonian Section numbers).

The order of books: Gospels, Acts, Catholic epistles and Pauline epistles.

Text 

The Greek text of the codex is a representative of the Byzantine text-type. Hermann von Soden classified it to the textual family K1. Aland placed it in Category V.

According to the Claremont Profile Method it represents textual family Kx in Luke 1, Luke 10, and Luke 20.

Some corrections were made by other hand.

History 

The manuscript was written by Basilius, a monk and diakon. It was examined by Griesbach. C. R. Gregory saw it in 1888.

It is currently housed at the Bibliotheek der Rijksuniversiteit (B. P. Gr. 74a), at Leiden.

See also 
 List of New Testament minuscules
 Biblical manuscript
 Textual criticism

References

Further reading 

 Jakobus Dermout, Collectanea Critica in Novum Testamentum (Leiden 1825).

Greek New Testament minuscules
13th-century biblical manuscripts